Robert Lamie (28 December 1928 — 1981) was a Scottish professional footballer who played as a winger. He made eight appearances in the Football League for Cardiff City and Swansea Town.

Career
Lamie had played youth football for Scottish side Stonehouse Violet before joining Cardiff City in October 1949. A month later, he was given his professional debut in a 1–0 defeat to West Ham United. He remained with the club until March 1951, making six league appearances and scoring once, but struggled to break into the first team past established players George Edwards and Mike Tiddy.

After leaving Cardiff, he signed for their local rivals Swansea Town. He made his debut for the club in a 2–2 draw with Nottingham Forest in place of Jack O'Driscoll in October 1951 but made only one further appearance before leaving the club to join Lincoln City in October 1952. However, he never played a first team match for Lincoln. He later played for Kettering Town and Bedworth United.

References

1928 births
1981 deaths
Scottish footballers
Cardiff City F.C. players
Swansea City A.F.C. players
Lincoln City F.C. players
Kettering Town F.C. players
Bedworth United F.C. players
English Football League players
Association football wingers